Rosina Wachtmeister (born in Vienna, 1939) is an Austrian artist, whose work includes cat sculptures and portraits. Her Das Lied von der Liebe is a book whose graphics illustrate the biblical Song of Songs.

A list of her books can be seen at the website of the German National Library.

Publications
Wachtmeister, Rosina: Das Lied von der Liebe. Pattloch, Munich, 2004. . Died in 2009

References

External links
Official website

Living people
1939 births
20th-century Austrian women artists
21st-century Austrian women artists
Artists from Vienna
Austrian women painters